Numidia (Berber: Inumiden; 202–40 BC) was the ancient kingdom of the Numidians located in northwest Africa, initially comprising the territory that now makes up modern-day Tunisia, but later expanding across what is today known as Tunisia, Libya, and some parts of Morocco. The polity was originally divided between the Massylii in the east and the Masaesyli in the west. During the Second Punic War (218–201 BC), Masinissa, king of the Massylii, defeated Syphax of the Masaesyli to unify Numidia into one kingdom. The kingdom began as a sovereign state and later alternated between being a Roman province and a Roman client state.

Numidia, at its largest extent, was bordered by Mauretania to the west, at the Moulouya River, Africa Proconsularis to the east, the Mediterranean Sea to the north, and the Sahara to the south. It was one of the first major states in the history of Algeria and the Berbers.

History

Independence

The Greek historians referred to these peoples as "Νομάδες" (i.e. Nomads), which by Latin interpretation became "Numidae" (but cf. also the correct use of Nomades). Historian Gabriel Camps, however, disputes this claim, favoring instead an African origin for the term.

The Numidians were composed of two great tribal groups: the Massylii in eastern Numidia, and the Masaesyli in the west. During the first part of the Second Punic War, the eastern Massylii, under their king Gala, were allied with Carthage, while the western Masaesyli, under king Syphax, were allied with Rome. The Kingdom of Masaesyli under Syphax extended from the Moulouya river to Oued Rhumel.

However, in 206 BC, the new king of the eastern Massylii, Masinissa, allied himself with Rome, and Syphax of the Masaesyli switched his allegiance to the Carthaginian side. At the end of the war, the victorious Romans gave all of Numidia to Masinissa of the Massylii. At the time of his death in 148 BC, Masinissa's territory extended from the Moulouya to the boundary of the Carthaginian territory, and also southeast as far as Cyrenaica to the gulf of Sirte, so that Numidia entirely surrounded Carthage (Appian, Punica, 106) except towards the sea. Furthermore, after the capture of Syphax the king in modern day Morocco with his capital based in Tingis, Bokkar, had become a vassal of Massinissa. Massinissa had also penetrated as far south beyond the Atlas to the Gaetuli and Fezzan was part of his domain.

In 179 B.C. Masinissa had received a golden crown from the inhabitants of Delos as he had offered them a shipload of grain. A statue of Masinissa was set up in Delos in honour of him as well as an inscription dedicated to him in Delos by a native from Rhodes. His sons too had statues of them erected on the island of Delos and the King of Bithynia, Nicomedes, had also dedicated a statue to Masinissa.

After the death of the long-lived Masinissa around 148 BC, he was succeeded by his son Micipsa. When Micipsa died in 118 BC, he was succeeded jointly by his two sons Hiempsal I and Adherbal and Masinissa's illegitimate grandson, Jugurtha, who was very popular among the Numidians. Hiempsal and Jugurtha quarrelled immediately after the death of Micipsa. Jugurtha had Hiempsal killed, which led to open war with Adherbal.

Agriculture 
The Numidian kingdom was very famous for its agricultural yield, besides lettuce, beans, and other grains already consumed by berbers since the dawn of time, Numidia was very productive when it came to its famous quality wheat, very similar to the wheat farmed along the banks of the egyptian nile. According to the Roman historian Pliny the elder:

In 179 B.C. the king of Numidia Masinissa received a golden crown from the inhabitants of Delos as he had offered them a shipload of grain. A statue of Masinissa was set up in Delos in honour of him as well as an inscription dedicated to him in Delos by a native from Rhodes. His sons too had statues of them erected on the island of Delos and the King of Bithynia, Nicomedes, had also dedicated a statue to Masinissa. By 143 A.D, the export of olive oil from Numidia rivaled its grain export throughout the Roman Empire.

War with Rome

By 112 BC, Jugurtha resumed his war with Adherbal. He incurred the wrath of Rome in the process by killing some Roman businessmen who were aiding Adherbal. After a brief war with Rome, Jugurtha surrendered and received a highly favourable peace treaty, which raised suspicions of bribery once more. The local Roman commander was summoned to Rome to face corruption charges brought by his political rival Gaius Memmius. Jugurtha was also forced to come to Rome to testify against the Roman commander, where Jugurtha was completely discredited once his violent and ruthless past became widely known, and after he had been suspected of murdering a Numidian rival.

War broke out between Numidia and the Roman Republic and several legions were dispatched to North Africa under the command of the Consul Quintus Caecilius Metellus Numidicus. The war dragged out into a long and seemingly endless campaign as the Romans tried to defeat Jugurtha decisively. Frustrated at the apparent lack of action, Metellus' lieutenant Gaius Marius returned to Rome to seek election as Consul. Marius was elected, and then returned to Numidia to take control of the war. He sent his Quaestor Sulla to neighbouring Mauretania in order to eliminate their support for Jugurtha. With the help of Bocchus I of Mauretania, Sulla captured Jugurtha and brought the war to a conclusive end. Jugurtha was brought to Rome in chains and was placed in the Tullianum.

Jugurtha was executed by the Romans in 104 BC, after being paraded through the streets in Gaius Marius' Triumph.

Divided kingdom
After the death of Jugurtha, the far west of Numidia was added to the lands of Bocchus I, king of Mauretania. A rump kingdom continued to be governed by native princes. It appears that on the death of King Gauda in 88 BC, the kingdom was divided into a larger eastern kingdom and a smaller western kingdom (roughly the Petite Kabylie). The kings of the east minted coins, while no known coins of the western kings survive. The western kings may have been vassals of the eastern.

The civil war between Caesar and Pompey brought an end to independent Numidia in 46 BC. The western kingdom between the Sava (Oued Soummam) and Ampsaga (Oued-el-Kebir) rivers passed to Bocchus II, while the eastern kingdom became a Roman province. The remainder of the western kingdom plus the city of Cirta, which may have belonged to either kingdom, became briefly an autonomous principality under Publius Sittius. Between 44 and 40 BC, the old western kingdom was once again under a Numidian king, Arabio, who killed Sittius and took his place. He involved himself in Rome's civil wars and was himself killed.

Roman provinces

Eastern Numidia was annexed in 46 BC to create a new Roman province, Africa Nova. Western Numidia was also annexed as part of the province Africa Nova after the death of its last king, Arabio, in 40 BC, and subsequently the province (except of Western Numidia) was united with province Africa Vetus by Emperor Augustus in 25 BC, to create the new province Africa Proconsularis. During the brief period (30–25 BC) Juba II (son of Juba I) ruled as a client king of Numidia on the territory of former province Africa Nova.

In AD 40, the western portion of Africa Proconsularis, including its legionary garrison, was placed under an imperial legatus, and in effect became a separate province of Numidia, though the legatus of Numidia remained nominally subordinate to the proconsul of Africa until AD 203. In 193 AD, under Septimius Severus, Numidia was separated from Africa Proconsularis, and governed by an imperial procurator.

In the reorganization of the empire by Diocletian, Numidia was divided in two provinces: the north became Numidia Cirtensis, with capital at Cirta, while the south, which included the Aurès Mountains and was threatened by raids, became Numidia Militiana, "Military Numidia", with capital at the legionary base of Lambaesis.

Subsequently Emperor Constantine the Great reunited the two provinces in a single one, administered from Cirta, which was now renamed Constantina (modern Constantine) in his honour. Its governor was raised to the rank of consularis in 320, and the province remained one of the six provinces of the Diocese of Africa until the invasion of the Vandals in 428, which began its slow decay, accompanied by desertification. It was restored to Roman rule after the Vandalic War, when it became part of the new Praetorian prefecture of Africa.

Architecture

The term “Royal Numidian Architecture” was coined for the monuments that were constructed by the Numidian kings. These monuments consist of tombs, tumuli and sanctuaries. Some examples of these structures are the mausoleum of Thugga, the tomb of Beni Rhenane, a tomb at Henchur Burgu in Djerba as well as two tumulus tombs known as the Madghacen and the Royal Mausoleum of Mauretania. There are also altars that were built at Simitthus and Kbor Klib. All of these monuments were built within the area ruled by Massinissa and his descendants.

Major cities
Numidia became highly romanized and was studded with numerous towns. The chief towns of Roman Numidia were: in the north, Cirta or modern Constantine, the capital, with its port Russicada (Modern Skikda); and Hippo Regius (near Bône), well known as the see of St. Augustine. To the south in the interior military roads led to Theveste (Tebessa) and Lambaesis (Lambessa) with extensive Roman remains, connected by military roads with Cirta and Hippo, respectively.

Lambaesis was the seat of the Legio III Augusta, and the most important strategic centre. It commanded the passes of the Aurès Mountains (Mons Aurasius), a mountain block that separated Numidia from the Gaetuli Berber tribes of the desert, and which was gradually occupied in its whole extent by the Romans under the Empire. Including these towns, there were altogether twenty that are known to have received at one time or another the title and status of Roman colonies; and in the 5th century, the Notitia Dignitatum enumerates no fewer than 123 sees whose bishops assembled at Carthage in 479.

Episcopal sees 
See Numidia (Roman province)#Episcopal sees.

See also
 List of Kings of Numidia
 Numidians
 Numidian cavalry
 Roman Libya
 Africa (Roman province)
 Shawiya language

References

Further reading

 
Countries in ancient Africa
States and territories established in the 3rd century BC
3rd-century BC establishments
202 BC
200s BC establishments
1st-century BC disestablishments in the Roman Empire
1st-century BC disestablishments
Berber dynasties
Roman client kingdoms
Provinces of the Byzantine Empire
Ancient Greek geography of North Africa
Former kingdoms